A model airport is a scale model of an airport.
While airport models have been around, in a way, since airfields were open to the public, early model airports were basically restricted to public showcases about the airport and its surroundings to the public; these were usually located inside the airport themselves.

Since Herpa Wings's introduction of their airport set series to their line of airline related toys, there has been an increase of aircraft modelers who have made mock airports to showcase their private collection of model aircraft. Often, the collector will model their airport after a real-life airport.

Model airports can be made to look very realistic, with many real airport features such as terminals, control towers, cargo terminals, hangars, passenger bridges and more, Gemini Jets, Herpa Wings, and JC Wings have produced ground support equipment in various scales.

Collectors who make model airports may use die-cast models for their creation. Among the brands of die cast aircraft models most commonly used on these airports are Aeroclassics, Herpa Wings, Dragon Models Limited, Gemini Jets, Phoenix Models, JC Wings, and NG Model.

In 2011, what may be the world's largest model airport opened for public view at Miniatur Wunderland, Hamburg, Germany. Knuffingen International Airport is based on Hamburg International Airport.
Another popular park in Europe, Madurodam in the Netherlands, includes a model airport featuring models of several airlines such as KLM, Emirates, Lufthansa, EVA Air, Turkish Airlines, UPS Airlines, Transavia, Thai Airways, Korean Air, Delta Air Lines and an A380 of Singapore Airlines, alongside (inaccurately) a DHL Airbus A300. The Madurodam airport is based on Amsterdam's Schiphol Airport.

See also
Diorama
Model building

References

Scale modeling